Jorge Enrique Ramírez Gallego (born 25 March 1940) is a former Colombian football forward. He is the all-time leading goal-scorer for Deportivo Cali and among the top five all-time goal-scorers in the Fútbol Profesional Colombiano.

Career
Born in Cali, Gallego began his professional football career with Millonarios in 1962, where he would win three league titles. He had a brief spell with Deportes Quindío before moving to Deportivo Cali in 1965 where he scored 168 goals in nine seasons. He finished his playing career with Deportes Tolima in 1975.

Gallego made 14 appearances and scored four goals for the Colombia national football team from 1966 to 1970.

References

External links

1940 births
Living people
Colombian footballers
Colombia international footballers
Categoría Primera A players
Millonarios F.C. players
Deportes Quindío footballers
Deportivo Cali footballers
Deportes Tolima footballers
Association football forwards
Footballers from Cali